Aphelodoris antillensis is a species of sea slug, a dorid nudibranch, shell-less marine gastropod mollusks in the family Dorididae.

Description 
The maximum recorded length is 29 mm.

Habitat 
Minimum recorded depth is 0.6 m. Maximum recorded depth is 12 m.

References

Dorididae
Gastropods described in 1879